Vassaunet is a small rural village in the municipality of Steinkjer in Trøndelag county, Norway, about  north of the town of Steinkjer and about the same distance south from the village of Følling.  The village lies just to the west of the European route E6 highway.  Approximately 15 people live there, most of them farmers.

References

Villages in Trøndelag
Steinkjer